The Bolivia Fed Cup team represents Bolivia in Fed Cup tennis competition and are governed by the Federación Boliviana de Tenis.  They currently compete in the Americas Zone of Group II.

History
Bolivia competed in its first Fed Cup in 1991.  Their best result was reaching Group I in 2005.

Current team (2017)
 Noelia Zeballos
 Hortência Birnbaumer
 María Fernanda Álvarez Terán
 Paola Cortez Vargas

See also
 Fed Cup
 Bolivia Davis Cup team

External links
 

Billie Jean King Cup teams
Fed Cup
Fed Cup